Kirop is a surname of Kenyan origin. Notable people with the surname include:

Helena Kirop (born 1976), Kenyan marathon runner
Pius Maiyo Kirop (born 1990), Kenyan half marathon runner
Sammy Kirop Kitwara (born 1986), Kenyan road runner

See also
Kiprop

Kalenjin names